Porvarin morsian (Finnish: The Bourgeois Bride) is a historical novel by Finnish author Kaari Utrio.

Novels by Kaari Utrio
Novels set in the 16th century
1981 novels
20th-century Finnish novels
Finnish historical novels